The Child Ballads is the colloquial name given to a collection of 305 ballads collected in the 19th century by Francis James Child and originally published in ten volumes between 1882 and 1898 under the title The English and Scottish Popular Ballads.

The ballads
Following are synopses of the stories recounted in the ballads in Child's collection. Since Child included multiple versions of most ballads, the details of a story can vary widely. The synopses presented here reflect the summaries in Child's text, but also rely on other sources as well as the ballads themselves.

References

Child Ballads
Murder ballads